Bus 44 is a Venice and Sundance Film Festival award-winning short film written and directed by Chinese-American filmmaker Dayyan Eng in 2001, starring Chinese actress Gong Beibi and Wu Chao. Bus 44 takes place on the outskirts of a small town and tells the story of a bus driver (Gong) and her passengers' encounter with highway robbers. The film was loosely based on an amalgamation of supposed true events, though there has never been any verified source.

Plot 
The short film introduces a female driver driving a bus on a remote road. A young man came up on the way. The two people had a good impression during their conversation. Two gangsters stopped the bus and boarded it. They got on the bus and robbed all the passengers' belongings. However, the gangsters did not end their crime at robbery, but they also pulled the female driver out of the bus and raped her.

At the critical moment, all the passengers in the car thought "more is worse than less" and chose to remain indifferent. Only the guy went down to rescue the female driver, but he was also stabbed in the leg with a knife and beaten by the culprit. After that, the two gangsters left, and the traumatized female driver returned to the car, but removed the young man out of the bus and took the other passengers on the road. The young man had to get in another car to move on. Later, he found that there were many policemen in front of him. After asking, he learned that the female driver drove the bus down the cliff, and neither she nor the other passengers were spared.

Production 
Bus 44 was director Dayyang Eng's first professional short film. It was shot on 35mm film stock with a small cast and crew on the outskirts of Beijing in 2001. 

Commenting on the film, the director stated, "I have always been interested in social psychology and wanted to do a film about how people react under certain stressful circumstances. The story attracts me not only because it has an interesting plot with a twist, but mostly because the underlying theme is even more haunting than the events that take place. I intentionally made this film with a certain ambiguity of time and place -- this story could have taken place anywhere in the world. Making films about people and human nature attracts me because I feel that people around the world have much more in common than they do differences. "Bus 44" carries a universal theme that travels across all boundaries and societies, trespassing the dark side and bright side of human behavior."

Reception and legacy 
Bus 44 The film was covered extensively in the Chinese media and was critically acclaimed in Asia, United States and Europe gaining TV and theatrical distribution in territories worldwide.  The film won awards at Venice Film Festival, Sundance Film Festival, and was invited to Cannes Film Festival the first time a Chinese-language short film won in all three festivals' history.

Bus 44 has been viewed by millions of people around the world on TV, in theaters, and online. In China and Korea, the film has been widely available online since its debut, and on YouTube alone, the film has garnered almost 5 millions views. 

In 2013, American stand-up comedian, Reginald D. Hunter, related the entire plot of Bus 44 to audiences during one of his routines about "f*** you movies".

Awards 

Special Jury Award - 2001 Venice Film Festival
Jury Honorable Mention - 2002 Sundance Film Festival
Directors' Fortnight - 2002 Cannes Film Festival
Grand Jury Award - 2002 Florida Film Festival
Official Selection - 2003 New York Film Festival
Official Selection - 2002 Clermont-Ferrand International Short Film Festival
Official Selection - 2002 Hong Kong International Film Festival
Official Selection - 2002 Seattle International Film Festival
Official Selection - 2002 Toronto Worldwide Short Film Festival
Official Selection - 2002 Edinburgh International Film Festival
Official Selection - 2001 Pusan International Film Festival
Official Selection - 2001 Gijon International Film Festival

External links 
 
 
 Bus 44 Colordance page at the Wayback Machine
Official "Bus 44" Site
Dayyan Eng Biography & Filmography
 Gong Beibi's Official Site

2001 films
Chinese short films
2000s Mandarin-language films
2001 short films
Films about buses